Zachary Karabell (born July 6, 1967) is the founder of the Progress Network at New America, president of River Twice Capital, an author, and a columnist. In 2003, the World Economic Forum designated him a "Global Leader for Tomorrow."

Career 
Karabell sits on the board of New America and PEN America. Previously, he was Head of Global Strategies at Envestnet, a publicly traded financial services firm where he worked with the board and senior management on corporate strategy and with the investment committee on overall investment approaches for the firm. Prior to that, he was Executive Vice President, Chief Economist, and Head of Marketing at Fred Alger Management, a New York-based investment firm. He was also President of Fred Alger & Company, a broker-dealer and Portfolio Manager of the China-U.S. Growth Fund. At Alger, he oversaw the creation, launch and marketing of several funds, led strategy for strategic acquisitions, and represented the firm at public forums and in the media. In addition, he founded and ran the River Twice Fund from 2011-2013, an alternative investment fund which used sustainable business as its primary investment theme.

Education 
Karabell was educated at Columbia, Oxford and Harvard, where he received his Ph.D.. He has taught at several leading universities, including Harvard and Dartmouth, and has written widely on economics, investing, history and international relations.

Books and Publications 
His most recent book, Inside Money: Brown Brothers Harriman and the American Way of Power, was published by Penguin Press in May 2021. He is the author of eleven previous books, including The Leading Indicators: A Short History of the Numbers That Rule Our World (Simon & Schuster, 2014); The Last Campaign: How Harry Truman Won the 1948 Election (which won the Chicago Tribune Heartland Award for best non-fiction book of the year in 2000); Superfusion: How China and America Became One Economy and Why the World’s Prosperity Depends On It (Simon & Schuster, 2009); and Sustainable Excellence: The Future of Business in the 21st Century, co-authored with Aron Cramer (Rodale 2010). His next book is a global history of corn.

As a commentator, Karabell is a regular columnist for Time and Contributing Editor for Politico, and the host of the podcast “What Could Go Right?” Previously he wrote “The Edgy Optimist” column for Slate, Reuters, and The Atlantic. He is a LinkedIn Influencer, and an occasional commentator on CNBC, Fox Business and MSNBC, and was a Contributing Editor for Wired and The Daily Beast. He also contributes to such publications as The Washington Post, The Guardian, The Daily Beast, The Atlantic, Time Magazine, The Wall Street Journal, The Los Angeles Times, The New York Times, The Financial Times, and Foreign Affairs.

Notes

References
The Pragmatic Caliphs, The New York Times, January 6, 2008
Q&A With Alger's Zachary Karabell: Credit Crunch Doesn't Dim Corporate Prospects, Tech Trader Daily - Barron's Online, August 20, 2007

Bibliography

External links
Author Biography at Random House Website

The author's contributions to The Daily Beast

Writers from New York (state)
Living people
Columbia University alumni
Alumni of the University of Oxford
Harvard University alumni
American male non-fiction writers
21st-century American historians
21st-century American male writers
New America (organization)
1967 births